Sári Fedák (born Sarolta Klára Mária Fedák; 27 September 1879, in Beregszász (present-day Berehove), Ukraine – 5 May 1955, in Budapest, Hungary) was a Hungarian actress and singer, one of the most well-known prima donnas of her time. According to American journalist and non-fiction writer Richard Traubner, Fedák and Sári Petráss remain "the two best-remembered Hungarian female operetta stars of all time".

Life
She studied acting with Szidi Rákosi until 1899, beginning her career the same year with the Magyar Színház theatre company. Beginning in 1900 she played in Pozsony (now Bratislava), and in several theatres in Budapest, including Népszínház, Király Színház, and Vígszínház. Following World War I, she spoke out against the Austro-Hungarian monarchy. Later, during the era of the Hungarian Soviet Republic she agitated for joining the Red Army. 

After the fall of the Republic, Fedák fled to Vienna, but was captured and held in prison at Wiener Neustadt for a short time. As she supported the Republic, she could play in only Vienna from  1920-21. She made appearances in Berlin and Paris in 1921 and 1925. In 1934, she toured several American cities.

Personal life
In 1922 she married writer Ferenc Molnár, after a six-year relationship. The couple divorced in 1925 or 1926, after "he had accused her of intimacy with 42 gentlemen, and she had replied in kind with a list of 142 ladies".

In 1923, she became a member of the Fővárosi Operettszínház theatre. Starting in 1940, she was the leading actress in the Új Magyar Színház theatre. In 1944, working at the Donausender radio station in Vienna, she rallied for Hungary to continue the fight in World War II on the side of Nazi Germany and was sentenced to eight months in prison after the war. She was also banned from playing in theatres for three years. She never appeared on stage again.  After being released from prison, she moved to Nyáregyháza, retiring from active life. She died in 1955, aged 75, and was interred in Budapest's Farkasréti Cemetery.

Selected filmography
 Mother (1937)

References

Sources
  - Sári Fedák in the Hungarian Theatrical Lexicon (György, Székely. Magyar Színházművészeti Lexikon. Budapest: Akadémiai Kiadó, 1994), freely available on mek.oszk.hu (in Hungarian)
 Tibor, Bános . Aki szelet vet. Budapest:Magvető 1986.

External links 

 

1879 births
1955 deaths
People from Berehove
Hungarian silent film actresses
20th-century Hungarian actresses
Burials at Farkasréti Cemetery